Dame Judith Helen McGregor  (born 1948) is a New Zealand lawyer, journalist, public servant and academic. She is currently a full professor at Auckland University of Technology and chairs the Waitematā District Health Board.

Career
McGregor completed a BA from the University of Waikato in 1970, where she was founded editor of Nexus, the student magazine.
Working as a journalist she rose to editorship of the Sunday News and the Auckland Star and serving on the Broadcasting Standards Authority. She took a stand against the 1981 Springboks tour, and walked in the 1975 Maori land march.

In the 2004 New Year Honours, McGregor was appointed a Companion of the New Zealand Order of Merit, for services to journalism. 

After a PhD in political communication, McGregor worked as a Professor at Massey University. Between 2003 and 2013 (two terms) McGregor served as the first Equal Employment Opportunities Commissioner for the New Zealand Human Rights Commission, appointed by Minister Margaret Wilson and replaced in the role by politician Jackie Blue.
As commissioner her report  'Caring Counts' based on undercover work in the aged care industry had a huge impact and lead ultimately to the a historic industry-wide settlement.

McGregor then moved to Auckland University of Technology as professor. In 2016 McGregor was named supreme winner of Women in Governance Awards. After the resignation of Dr Lester Levy as chair of the Waitematā District Health Board, the Minister of Health (David Clark) appointed McGregor as his successor, effective 10 June 2018.

McGregor was promoted to Dame Companion of the New Zealand Order of Merit, for services to human rights and health, in the 2022 Queen's Birthday and Platinum Jubilee Honours.

Selected works
 New Zealand Human Rights Commission. "Caring Counts, Tautiaki tika." (2012).
 McGregor, Judy, and Lance Gray. "Stereotypes and older workers: The New Zealand experience." Social Policy Journal of New Zealand (2002): 163–177.
 McGregor, Judy, and David Tweed. "Profiling a new generation of female small business owners in New Zealand: Networking, mentoring and growth." Gender, Work & Organization 9, no. 4 (2002): 420–438.
 McGregor, Judy, David Tweed, and Richard Pech. "Human capital in the new economy: devil's bargain?." Journal of Intellectual Capital 5, no. 1 (2004): 153–164.
 Gray, Lance, and Judy McGregor. "Human resource development and older workers: Stereotypes in New Zealand." Asia Pacific Journal of Human Resources 41, no. 3 (2003): 338–353.

References

External links
 

Living people
1948 births
New Zealand women academics
New Zealand journalists
Massey University alumni
University of Waikato alumni
Academic staff of the Massey University
Dames Companion of the New Zealand Order of Merit
New Zealand public servants
Waitemata District Health Board members
Academic staff of the Auckland University of Technology